Blue Powder Grey Smoke is a 1986 computer wargame published by Gardé Games of Distinction.

Gameplay
Blue Powder Grey Smoke is a game in which the operational and tactical encounters of the American Civil War are covered.

Reception
Jay C. Selover reviewed the game for Computer Gaming World, and stated that "if the Civil War is a passion for you, you'll just have to swallow hard and accept a few things. If, on the other hand, you would like to see just how easy it is for a crack division of 6000 men to turn into a frightened mob running back to Washington, give this one a look."

References

External links
Article in Computer Game Forum
Article in Compute!'s Gazette

1986 video games
American Civil War video games
Apple II games
Commodore 64 games
Computer wargames
Real-time strategy video games
Video games developed in the United States